The Jarral Rajputs (also spelled Jaral, Jarral, Jerral) are a Muslim Rajput tribe of Azad Kashmir and Punjab provinces of Pakistan.

References 

Social groups of Pakistan
Surnames
Rajput clans of Punjab